The term French Assembly may refer to any of several French legislative bodies throughout the history of France, including:

The National Assembly (French Revolution) formed during the French Revolution on June 17, 1789
The National Constituent Assembly, which succeeded the National Assembly on July 9, 1789
The Legislative Assembly (France), which succeeded the National Constituent Assembly on October 1, 1791
The modern National Assembly of France under the Third, Fourth, and Fifth Republics.